Aloysius “Luigi” Macchi (3 March 1832, in Viterbo – 29 March 1907, in Rome) was an Italian Catholic nobleman and a Cardinal.

He was a nephew of Cardinal Vincenzo Macchi. In 1859, he was ordained a priest. In 1860, he was referendary of the Tribunal of the Apostolic Signature of Grace. Pope Leo XIII created him a cardinal in the consistory of 11 February 1889. As protodeacon since 1899, Cardinal Macchi announced the election of cardinal Giuseppe Melchiorre Sarto as Pope Pius X at the end of the conclave of 1903 and crowned him on 9 August 1903. Four years later, Cardinal Macchi died after an illness at the age of 75.

References

External links
The Cardinals of the Holy Roman Church
Catholic Hierarchy 

|-

19th-century Italian cardinals
Protodeacons
1832 births
1907 deaths
Cardinals created by Pope Leo XIII
People from Viterbo